Gitanjali Rao (born 1972) is an Indian theatre actress, animator and  film maker.

Biography and career
Gitanjali  graduated as an applied artist from Sir. J. J. Institute of Applied Art, Mumbai, in 1994. Two animated short films independently produced and directed by her, Orange and 'Printed Rainbow'. Her debut animation short Printed Rainbow (2006) had won the Kodak Short Film Award, Small Golden Rail and the Young Critics Award  at Critics Week section at Cannes in 2006. The film has also won the Golden Conch for Best Animation Film in the 2006 Mumbai International Film Festival.

She has served in the judge's panel at various festivals including the 2011 Cannes Critic's Week short films jury. In 2013, she directed a segment in Shorts,  a compilation of five short films, along with Neeraj Ghaywan, Vasan Bala, Anubhuti Kashyap and Shlok Sharma, and produced by Anurag Kashyap.

At the 2014 Cannes Film Festival, her animated short, True Love Story was one of 10 selected short films at Critics' Week.
Her latest animated feature Bombay Rose (2019) was one of the International Critics Choice screenings at Poff film festival in Tallinn and was also screened at the Venice International Film Critics Week 2019.

Filmography
Printed Rainbow (2006) - Director, producer and animator.
 Shorts (2013)
Chai (2013)
True Love Story (2014)
October (2018) - Debut as a film actor.
Bombay Rose (2019)

Accolades

Kodak Short Film Award
Small Golden Rail
Young Critics Award

Locarno Film Festival
 2022 — Locarno Kids Award at 75th Locarno Film Festival on August 8 at Locarno’s Piazza Grande accompanied by screening of her animated short film Printed Rainbow.

As jury
 2022 — She was selected as jury member in Filmmakers of the present competition category at 75th Locarno Film Festival.

References

External links

Indian animators
Indian women film directors
1972 births
Living people
Film directors from Mumbai
University of Mumbai alumni
Indian women animators
Women artists from Maharashtra
21st-century Indian women artists
21st-century Indian film directors
Hindi-language film directors